The following people were born or based their life in Bijapur:

 Bhāskara II
 Basava – philosopher and a social reformer (Born in Ingaleshwar)
 Ranna (ರನ್ನ) – one of the earliest poets of Kannada language
Satyanatha Tirtha, 17th century Hindu philosopher and saint and 20th peetadhipathi of Uttaradi Math of Dvaita Vedanta.
 Basappa Danappa Jatti
 Aravind Malagatti
 S. R. Kanthi
 M. B. Patil Minister for Water Resources, Government of Karnataka
 Venkanna H. Naik
 Amirbai Karnataki
 Aluru Venkata Rao
 M. M. Kalburgi
 Sunil Kumar Desai – One of the finest filmmaker of Kannada film industry
 Rajeshwari Gayakwad, cricketer
 Jyoti Gogte

List
Bijapur
people from Bijapur